The PRS Standard 22 (Platinum) is a visually and sonically distinctive electric guitar handmade by Paul Reed Smith. It has a 10" radius rosewood fretboard on a wide fat mahogany neck and a postmodern carved mahogany body with two Dragon II humbucking pickups.

External links
PRS Guitars - Official Site

Guitars